Aleksandar Vasiljević (born 19 June 1982) is a retired Bosnian Serb footballer.

Born in Rudo, SR Bosnia and Herzegovina, he spent most of his career in Serbia.

References

External links
 Article at B92

1982 births
Living people
People from Rudo
Serbs of Bosnia and Herzegovina
Association football defenders
Bosnia and Herzegovina footballers
Serbia and Montenegro footballers
Serbian footballers
FK Jedinstvo Surčin players
FK Budućnost Dobanovci players
FK Bežanija players
Qingdao Hailifeng F.C. players
FK Sevojno players
FK Mladi Radnik players
FC Irtysh Pavlodar players
FK Jagodina players
FK Hajduk Kula players
FK Leotar players
FK Novi Pazar players
FK Donji Srem players
FK Voždovac players
FK Napredak Kruševac players
FK Sloga Kraljevo players
Serbian First League players
Serbian SuperLiga players
Kazakhstan Premier League players
Premier League of Bosnia and Herzegovina players
Serbian expatriate footballers
Expatriate footballers in China
Serbian expatriate sportspeople in China
Expatriate footballers in Kazakhstan
Serbian expatriate sportspeople in Kazakhstan